Nisia atrovenosa is a species of true bug in the family Meenoplidae. It is a pest of millets such as sorghum. Its predators include the mirid bug Cyrtorhinus lividipennis.

References

Meenoplidae
Insect pests of millets